Carol Schuurman (17 August 1934 – 3 April 2009) was a Dutch footballer. He played in four matches for the Netherlands national football team from 1958 to 1961.

References

1934 births
2009 deaths
Dutch footballers
Netherlands international footballers
Place of birth missing
Association footballers not categorized by position